Graham Steadman (born 8 December 1961) is an English former professional rugby league footballer who played in the 1980s and 1990s, and coached in the 2000s.

Playing career
Born in Knottingley, Steadman started his career in rugby union, playing for his hometown club Knottingley RUFC. In 1982, he switched to rugby league, and signed for York.

International honours
Graham Steadman won caps for Great Britain while at Castleford in 1990 against France, in 1992 against France, in 1992 in the 1989–1992 Rugby League World Cup against France, in 1992 against Australia (2 matches), in 1992 in the 1989–1992 Rugby League World Cup against Australia, in 1992 against New Zealand (2 matches), and in 1994 against France, and Australia.

County honours
Graham Steadman won a cap for Yorkshire while at Featherstone Rovers; during the 1988–89 season as an interchange/substitute against Lancashire, and he won caps for Yorkshire while at Castleford playing , and scoring 2-tries, and 4-goals in the 56–12 victory over Lancashire at Wigan's stadium on 20 September 1989, and as a substitute, i.e. number 14, in the 17–12 victory over Lancashire at Leeds' stadium on 18 September 1991.

Challenge Cup Final appearances
Graham Steadman played  in Castleford's 12–28 defeat by Wigan in the 1991–92 Challenge Cup Final during the 1991–92 season at Wembley Stadium, London on Saturday 2 May 1992, in front of a crowd of 77,386.

County Cup Final appearances
Graham Steadman played right- in Castleford's 11–8 victory over Wakefield Trinity in the 1990–91 Yorkshire Cup Final during the 1990–91 season at Elland Road, Leeds on Sunday 23 September 1990, and played, and scored two tries and four goals in the 28–6 victory over Bradford Northern in the 1991–92 Yorkshire Cup Final during the 1991–92 season at Elland Road, Leeds on Sunday 20 October 1991.

Regal Trophy Final appearances
Graham Steadman played  in Castleford's 33–2 victory over Wigan in the 1993–94 Regal Trophy Final during the 1993–94 season at Headingley, Leeds on Saturday 22 January 1994.

World transfer record
Castleford paid a then world transfer record of £170,000 for Graham Steadman when he moved from Featherstone Rovers in 1989 (based on increases in average earnings, this would be approximately £435,200 in 2013).

Career records
Graham Steadman holds York's "Most points in a season" record with 318-points scored in the 1984–85 season, beating Vic Yorke's 301-points set in the 1957–58 season.

Coaching career
Steadman was made full-time coach of the Castleford Tigers towards the end of 2001 after Stuart Raper left for Wigan. Steadman took the club to the top 6 playoffs in 2002 and then the club finished 8th in 2003. 2004 saw his worst year as coach when the club failed to win any games under Steadman. A lot of people blamed the board for not backing him with money to spend. Poor recruits such as Sean Rudder, Sean Ryan, Paul Newlove and Ryan Sheridan ended Steadman's reign as the Castleford Tigers boss and he was sacked after losing to Wakefield Trinity in a home league game.

Honoured at Castleford
Graham Steadman is a Castleford Hall of Fame Inductee.

References

External links
!Great Britain Statistics at englandrl.co.uk (statistics currently missing due to not having appeared for both Great Britain, and England)
Offiah hails arrival of Fielden

1961 births
Living people
Castleford Tigers coaches
Castleford Tigers players
English rugby league coaches
English rugby league players
Featherstone Rovers players
Gold Coast Chargers players
Great Britain national rugby league team players
Huddersfield Giants players
Rugby league five-eighths
Rugby league fullbacks
Rugby league players from Wakefield
Sportspeople from Knottingley
York Wasps players
Yorkshire rugby league team players